Melaleuca capitata is a shrub in the myrtle family, Myrtaceae and is endemic to New South Wales. It has scaly bark, a densely foliaged habit and attractive heads of creamy-yellow flowers on the ends of its branches in summer.

Description

The flowers are cream-colored and grouped in a short spike or a head at the ends of the branches which continue to grow after flowering. The stamens are arranged in five bundles around the flower and there are 15 to 33 stamens in each bundle. Flowering occurs between October and December and is followed by fruit which are woody capsules.

Taxonomy and naming
Melaleuca capitata was first formally described in 1924 by Edwin Cheel in Journal and Proceedings of the Royal Society of New South Wales from specimens collected in or near the present day Morton and Budawang national parks. The specific epithet (capitata) is from the Latin caput, meaning "head", referring to the shape of the inflorescence".

Distribution and habitat
This melaleuca occurs between Bundanoon and Braidwood in New South Wales on the South Coast, Central and Southern Tablelands including on the southern Blue Mountains. It grows in heath and dry sclerophyll forest on sandstone.

Use in horticulture
Melaleuca capitata is not well known in cultivation but adapts to most soils and situations when adequately watered.

References

capitata
Myrtales of Australia
Flora of New South Wales
Plants described in 1924
Taxa named by Edwin Cheel